Chiusdino is a comune (municipality) in the Province of Siena in the Italian region Tuscany, located about  south of Florence and about  southwest of Siena.

Chiusdino borders the following municipalities: Casole d'Elsa, Monticiano, Montieri, Radicondoli, Roccastrada, Sovicille.

References

External links

 Official website

Cities and towns in Tuscany